The history of aviation medicine began largely after World War I, when aircraft needed to fly to higher altitudes. In the Jet Age, aircraft became pressurised so rapid decompression became a hazard leading to passing out, high g-forces which led to G-LOC and ejection seats caused spinal compression and other injuries. Much of the adverse health effects in aviation are caused by rapid changes in atmospheric pressure, such as decompression sickness.

Aviation medicine is not purposed for people with diseases, but contingencies have been developed to allow people to go into low pressure environments, which in itself is a large medical challenge.

Paul Bert (1833-86) of France is known as the Father of Aviation Medicine, the first to research effects of air-pressure on health and oxygen toxicity; he worked with the French meteorologist Gaston Tissandier. The first fatalities from aviation hypoxia occurred on 15 April 1875 in France, when the balloon Zenith reached 28,200 ft.

World War I

Italy was the first country to develop research into aviation medicine in World War I, followed by France. Britain was the first country to look at the effects of atmospheric pressure on pilots. By 1917, Britain and America were collaborating on research into aviation medicine, with a combined report in March 1918 started by Brigadier General Theodore C. Lyster (1875-1933), who helped to form the United States Army Air School of Aviation Medicine in 1918.

Interwar era
In the interwar era, techniques in aviation medicine mainly started; aircraft were gradually becoming more advanced. The United States passed its Air Commerce Act on 20 May 1926, which laid down medical regulations for commercial pilots. In 1931, the Swiss physicist Auguste Piccard made important investigations of atmospheric pressure of the upper atmosphere (mesosphere).

The first pressurised aircraft flew on June 8, 1921 in the USA.

World War II
By 1941–42, some production military aircraft were pressurised for the first time.

Post-war

In the post-war era, jet aircraft were now commonplace. Jet engines allowed aircraft to reach much higher altitudes; an aircraft has a maximum height it can reach known as its ceiling.

Research
The RAF Institute of Aviation Medicine researched aviation medicine.

By country

United Kingdom

The RAF Medical Services was formed in April 1918; the RAF Nursing Service was formed in June 1918; the RAF Dental Branch was formed in July 1930 (later part of the Defence Dental Agency from March 1996 in Buckinghamshire, and now part of Defence Medical Services, based in Staffordshire).

United States
On 15 December 1928, the Aero Medical Association of the United States was formed. The United States Air Force Medical Service was formed in 1949.

See also
 Flight altitude record
 Aviation accidents and incidents

References

External links
 History of Flight Medicine

Aviation medicine
Medicine
History of medical and surgical specialties